The A5058 road, known as Queens Drive for much of its length, is a major ring road in Liverpool. The eastern section of the A5058 connects Breeze Hill in Bootle at the intersection with the A59, with Aigburth Vale in Aigburth at the other end.

The road has been described as being the first ring road to be built in the country and was designed around the idea that future growth would require a substantial road, despite no development reaching the area around the road until many years later. The road played a crucial role in offering development opportunities during the early 20th century, at a time when slum housing was being cleared in Liverpool City Centre and land was sought for new housing.

History

Planning
Often described as the first ring road in Britain, planning had been in discussion since the 19th century, with a circular boulevard plan proposed in 1853 although ultimately it did not materialise. Construction of the road began in the early 20th century and was designed by civil engineer John Alexander Brodie. Initially conceived with tram tracks running along the centre of the road, it was ultimately decided that a dual-carriageway formation was necessary in order to handle the anticipated increased traffic volumes.

Construction

The first section of road to be constructed was just to the east of the junction with the A59 road. Several existing roads, such as Black Horse Lane and Priory Road were incorporated into the new carriageway, some of which were realigned to fit with the plans, whilst new sections of road filled in the gaps. Extensive parts of the carriageway were planted with uniformly spaced out trees along lengthy sections, long before any planned built development in the surrounding area. The road played a significant role during the 1920s and 1930s, when new areas for housing development were required to rehouse people from slum clearances in the city centre.

References

Citations

Sources

External links

 A5058 at Sabre Roads

Roads in England
Transport in Liverpool
Roads in Merseyside
Ring roads in the United Kingdom